Warde is a surname. Notable people with the surname include:

Andrew Warde, colonist, judge and farmer
Anthony Warde, actor
Beatrice Warde, typographer
Sir Charles Warde, 1st Baronet, politician
Frederic Warde, typographer
Frederick Warde, actor
Geoffrey Warde, priest
George Warde, army officer
John William Warde
H. M. A. Warde, soldier and police officer
Harlan Warde, actor
Luke Warde, sea captain
Mary Francis Xavier Warde, nun
Richard Warde (cofferer), politician
Willie Warde, actor